Augraben may refer to:
Augraben (Liederbach), river in Hesse, Germany, tributary of the Liederbach
Augraben (Nebel), river in Mecklenburg-Vorpommern, Germany, tributary of the Nebel
Augraben (Tollense), river in Mecklenburg-Vorpommern, Germany, tributary of the Tollense